Abū al-Makārim Hibat Allāh ibn Zayn al-Dīn ibn Jumayʿ (هبة الله بن جميع, died 1198 / AH 594) was an Egyptian Jewish physician, chief physician at the court of Saladin.

Life
Ibn Jumayʿ was born to a Jewish family in Fustat, Egypt. He studied with the physician Ibn al-ʿAynzarbī (died 1153/AH 548) and entered the service of Saladin. According to Ibn Abi Usaibia's Lives of the Physicians, Ibn Jumayʿ wrote eight works on medical-related subjects.

A contemporary of Moses Maimonides, Ibn Jumayʿ "became famous for having prevented a person having a cataleptic fit from being buried alive. He was the author of a number of medical writings, including al-Irshād li-maṣāliḥ, dedicated to al-Baysanī, the vizier to Saladin, and completed by Ibn Jumayʿ al-Isrā’īlī's son Abū Tahir Ismāʿīl."

Works
 Kitāb al-irshād li-masālih an-nufūs waʿl-ajssad [Guide to the Welfare of Souls and Bodies]
 (ed. and tr. by Hartmut Fähndrich) Treatise to Salāh ad-Dīn on the revival of the art of medicine, English and Arab text, Wiesbaden: Steiner, 1983.

References

Further reading
 Fenton, Paul B., 'The state of Arab medicine at the time of Maimonides according to Ibn Gumayʿ's Treatise on the Revival of the Art of Medicine, in Fred Rosner and Samuel S. Kottek, ed., Moses Maimonides - Physician, Scientist and Philosopher, 1993
 Meyerhof, Max, 'Sultan Saladin's physician on the transmission of Greek medicine to the Arabs', Bulletin of the History of Medicine 18 (1945), 169-178

External links
 Ibn Jumay‘ al-Isrā’īlī or, Ibn Jami‘, Abū al-Makārim Hibat Allāh by National Library of Medicine

Medieval Jewish physicians of Egypt
12th-century Egyptian physicians
Year of birth unknown
1198 deaths
Physicians from Cairo
Saladin
Physicians from the Ayyubid Sultanate
Physicians from the Fatimid Caliphate